

The Waituna Lagoon is on the southern coastline of the South Island of New Zealand. It forms part of the Awarua Wetland, a Ramsar site that was established in 1976. It gives it name to waituna, a type of ephemeral coastal lake.

The lagoon is an important habitat for resident and migratory birds with seventy three different species being recorded. The expansion in the area of Leptocarpus rushes that has been observed over a 47-year period in the lagoon have been attributed to artificial openings of the lagoon to the sea, and the increase in sedimentation.

The lagoon is largely unmodified by human activity but there are elevated nutrient levels and sedimentation with a fear that it may lead to eutrophication.

Recreational use
Waituna Lagoon is a common fishing and game bird hunting spot. There is a good supply of brown trout in the lake/lagoon and its tributaries with a daily limit of two trout per person per day.
The fishing season runs from 1 October until 30 April.

There is a good range of game bird species, with mallard ducks being the primarily hunted species. Other game bird species hunted during the season include the shoveler/spoonbill, Canada geese (now classified as a pest species), paradise ducks and the black swan (not often targeted by hunters).
Many families traditionally hunt the lake, such as the Carleen, Hourston, Lawson, McNaughton, Perriam, Thomas, Owen, Carston and Waghorn families who either have camps or live in the area.

See also
Coastline of New Zealand

References

External links
http://www.waituna.org.nz at Environment Southland
Awarua Wetland - Waituna Lagoon Department of Conservation
Waituna Lagoon at the National Wetland Trust

News

Landforms of Southland, New Zealand
Lagoons of New Zealand
Foveaux Strait
Wetlands of Southland, New Zealand